Lieutenant-Commander Edgar Christopher Cookson VC DSO (13 December 1883 – 28 September 1915) was an English recipient of the Victoria Cross, the highest and most prestigious award for gallantry in the face of the enemy that can be awarded to British and Commonwealth forces.

Cookson was born on 13 December 1883 to Capt. W. E. Cookson, R.N. He was 31 years old and a Lieutenant-Commander in the command of HMS Comet on the River Tigris when his actions, on 28 September 1915, during the advance on Kut-el-Amara, Mesopotamia earned him the Victoria Cross. He was shot several times by the enemy that day, and died within a few minutes.

Citation

References

Monuments to Courage (David Harvey, 1999)
The Register of the Victoria Cross (This England, 1997)
VCs of the First World War: The Naval VCs (Stephen Snelling, 2002)

External links
 

1883 births
1915 deaths
Royal Navy officers
British World War I recipients of the Victoria Cross
British military personnel killed in World War I
Royal Navy recipients of the Victoria Cross
People from Birkenhead
Royal Navy officers of World War I
Royal Navy personnel of the Boxer Rebellion